William A. Campbell  (April 12, 1917 – April 24, 2012) was an American pilot and military officer who served with the Tuskegee Airmen during World War II. He served as a wingman in the first combat mission of the Tuskegee Airmen, and rose to the rank of Group Commander of the 332nd Fighter Group shortly after World War II. He subsequently served in both the Korean War and Vietnam War.

Biography

Early life and education
He was born in Tuskegee, Alabama on April 12, 1917, the fourth child of Thomas Monroe Campbell, the first Cooperative Extension Agent in the United States, and Anna Campbell.  In total, he had five siblings, including three younger than himself.

He attended elementary and high school in Tuskegee, Alabama. He then matriculated at the Tuskegee Normal and Industrial Institute from which he graduated with his Bachelor of Science degree in Business in 1937.

Military career

Following his graduation from the Tuskegee Normal and Industrial Institute, Campbell went to work as a clerk for the U.S. Dept. of Agricultural Extension.  During his time working for Agricultural Extension, he encountered an opportunity to enroll in the Tuskegee Army Air Field class SE-42-F.  He graduated from the program on July 3, 1942 as a second lieutenant. Campbell was then assigned to the [[99th Fighter Squadron], commanded by then-Col. Benjamin O. Davis, Jr., of the [33d Fighter Group]] commanded by then-Col. William W. Momyer, which was stationed in Farjouna, Tunisia in 1943. 

Campbell flew in the first combat mission of the 99th Pursuit Squadron on June 2, 1943, as they served as wingmen to pilots of the during World War II.

Campbell, Spann Watson, and Herbert V. Clark were given orders to return to the United States to train replacement pilots.  They left the European theater on November 5, 1943 and reported for duty to the 553d Fighter-Bomber Squadron in Michigan in December 1943.

Campbell returned to the Europe in 1944 as a Captain and, on October 11, 1944, he rejoined the 99th FS which was, since July, 1944, reassigned from attachment with the 324th FG of the 12AF to the 332d Fighter Group, already consisting of the all black 10th, 301st, and 302nd fighter squadrons which had also come from the 12AF, but joined the 15AF in April, 1944 which by order of the 15AF, was given the tail identification color of red for their P-47D's and later P-51's that gave them the name "Red Tails". name=haulman_p57></ref>  The mission successfully destroyed 17 enemy airplanes on the ground. Eighteen days later, he assumed command of the 99th Fighter Group as a full Major, replacing Captain Alfonza W. Davis, on October 29, 1944.

Campbell received the Distinguished Flying Cross on New Year's Day 1945; the medal was presented to him by Brigadier General Dean C. Strother.

Three months later, on March 31, 1945, Campbell participated in a mission of the 332d Fighter Group to destroy railroad and other targets in the area surrounding Munich, Germany.  The mission successfully shot down 13 enemy fighters; Campbell was credited for one of the 13 kills.

On April 15, 1945, Campbell participated in another strafing mission of railroad targets in the areas around Munich, Salzburg, Linz, Pilzen, and Regensburg. For his actions, Campbell earned his second Distinguished Flying Cross.  He became the first African American pilot to receive the Distinguished Flying Cross when he was officially awarded the oak leaf cluster to his cross on May 29, 1945.

Over the course of World War II, Campbell actively served in the Sicilian and Italian campaigns and flew 106 missions, becoming the first African-American pilot to drop a bomb on enemy targets in United States history.

Following World War II, Maj. Campbell assumed the position of Group Commander of the 332nd Fighter Group on August 28, 1947. Campbell went on to fight in two more wars during his military career, as he served in both Korea and Vietnam. He remained in the service until 1970, reaching the rank of full colonel.

After his retirement from active duty in 1970, Campbell taught Defense Resource Management at the Naval Postgraduate School in Monterey, California for 13 years and was a member of the Tuskegee Airmen Commission established by the State of Alabama.

Marriage and children

He married Wilma Jean Burton from Chicago in September 1946. He and his wife had three sons: William A. Campbell, Jr., Stephen Campbell, and David Campbell.

Death and legacy

Colonel Campbell died at the age of 95 on April 24, 2012 in Phoenix, Arizona. He was buried with full military honors at Arlington National Cemetery.  The San Francisco Bay Area Chapter of the Tuskegee Airmen, Inc. was renamed in his honor. Colonel Campbell's personal papers documenting his military career, the Tuskegee Airmen and their service, as well as his personal life were donated to the University of California, Riverside.

Awards

Col. Campbell received numerous medals and awards during his military career, including two Distinguished Flying Crosses, the Bronze Star, the Legion of Merit and 13 Air Medal clusters.

References

Further reading

Books, Articles, and Reports
 Tuskegee Airmen Chronology / Daniel L. Haulman. -- Organizational History Branch, Air Force Historical Research Agency, Maxwell AFB, AL 36112-642424, July 2013

Audiovisual Materials
, Apr 28, 2012
Tuskegee Airmen Fly First Mission by Black Pilots : Interview with Colonel William A. Campbell, History.com, Retrieved November 16, 2013.

Archival Resources
 William A. Campbell Papers  (4.25 linear feet) are held at the Special Collections & Archives, University of California, Riverside Libraries.

External links
 Tuskegee Airmen at Tuskegee University
 Tuskegee Airmen Archives at the University of California, Riverside Libraries.
 Tuskegee Airmen, Inc.
 Tuskegee Airmen National Historic Site (U.S. National Park Service) 
 Tuskegee Airmen National Museum

1917 births
2012 deaths
Tuskegee Airmen
United States Air Force colonels
Recipients of the Distinguished Flying Cross (United States)
Tuskegee University alumni
Military personnel from Tuskegee, Alabama
Recipients of the Legion of Merit
People from Tuskegee, Alabama
Aviators from Alabama
African-American aviators
21st-century African-American people